Checkmate is a fictional covert operations agency, as published by DC Comics.

The roster of the agency has changed a great deal over the years. These roster lists are of the members during the agency's various incarnations.

The codenames listed under Character are those used during the time frame of the particular iteration. Characters with more than one codename for that period have them listed chronologically and separated by a slash (/). Bolded names in the most recent iteration published are the current agency members.

First appearance is the place where the character first appeared as a member of a particular iteration. It is not necessarily the first appearance of the character in print, nor the story depicting how the character joined the agency.

All information is listed in rank order first, then publication, and finally alphabetical.



Roster during Checkmate!

Roster between series

Roster during Checkmate vol. 2

Roster during Checkmate vol. 3

Checkmate members